The 2011–12 Memphis Grizzlies season was the 17th season of the franchise in the National Basketball Association (NBA), and the 11th for the franchise in Memphis.

Key dates
June 23: The 2011 NBA draft took place at Prudential Center in Newark, New Jersey.

Draft picks

Roster

Pre-season

Game log

|- bgcolor="#ffcccc"
| 1
| December 16
| New Orleans
| 
| Tony Allen (17)
| Brian Skinner (9)
| Jeremy Pargo (7)
| FedExForum
| 0–1
|- bgcolor=#ffcccc
| 2
| December 21
| @ New Orleans
| 
| Rudy Gay (20)
| Zach RandolphSam Young (8)
| Mike Conley (6)
| New Orleans Arena
| 0–2

Regular season

Standings

Record vs. opponents

Game log

|- bgcolor=#ffcccc
| 1
| December 26
| @ San Antonio
| 
| Rudy Gay (19)
| Rudy Gay (10)
| Mike Conley (7)
| AT&T Center18,581
| 0–1
|- bgcolor=#ffcccc
| 2
| December 28
| Oklahoma City
| 
| Zach Randolph (24)
| Zach Randolph (10)
| Jeremy Pargo (7)
| FedExForum18,119
| 0–2
|- bgcolor=#ccffcc
| 3
| December 30
| Houston
| 
| Zach Randolph (23)
| Zach Randolph (9)
| Josh Selby (7)
| FedExForum16,069
| 1–2

|- bgcolor=#ffcccc
| 4
| January 1
| @ Chicago
| 
| Sam YoungJosh Davis (10)
| Marc Gasol (10)
| O. J. Mayo (5)
| United Center22,763
| 1–3
|- bgcolor=#ccffcc
| 5
| January 3
| Sacramento
| 
| Rudy Gay (23)
| Marc Gasol (15)
| Mike Conley (7)
| FedExForum12,391
| 2–3
|- bgcolor=#ccffcc
| 6
| January 4
| @ Minnesota
| 
| Tony Allen (20)
| Marc Gasol (10)
| Mike Conley (8)
| Target Center17,404
| 3–3
|- bgcolor=#ffcccc
| 7
| January 6
| @ Utah
| 
| Tony Allen (21)
| Marc Gasol (11)
| Mike Conley (6)
| EnergySolutions Arena19,503
| 3–4
|- bgcolor=#ffcccc
| 8
| January 8
| @ L. A. Lakers
| 
| Rudy Gay (19)
| Marc Gasol (11)
| Mike Conley (8)
| Staples Center18,997
| 3–5
|- bgcolor=#ffcccc
| 9
| January 10
| Oklahoma City
| 
| Marc Gasol (20)
| Marc Gasol (14)
| Mike Conley (10)
| FedExForum13,601
| 3–6
|- bgcolor=#ccffcc
| 10
| January 12
| New York
| 
| Rudy Gay (26)
| Marc Gasol (12)
| Mike Conley (7)
| FedExForum15,234
| 4–6
|- bgcolor=#ccffcc
| 11
| January 14
| New Orleans
| 
| Rudy Gay (23)
| Marc Gasol (11)
| Mike Conley (7)
| FedExForum14,983
| 5–6
|- bgcolor=#ccffcc
| 12
| January 16
| Chicago
| 
| Rudy Gay (24)
| Marreese Speights (12)
| Mike Conley (8)
| FedExForum18,119
| 6–6
|- bgcolor=#ccffcc
| 13
| January 18
| @ New Orleans
| 
| Marc Gasol (22)
| Marc Gasol (12)
| Mike Conley (10)
| New Orleans Arena12,045
| 7–6
|- bgcolor=#ccffcc
| 14
| January 20
| @ Detroit
| 
| Rudy Gay (24)
| Marc Gasol (6)
| Mike Conley (11)
| The Palace of Auburn Hills10,255
| 8–6
|- bgcolor=#ccffcc
| 15
| January 21
| Sacramento
| 
| Rudy Gay (23)
| Marreese Speights (15)
| Mike Conley (6)
| FedExForum16,562
| 9–6
|- bgcolor=#ccffcc
| 16
| January 23
| @ Golden State
| 
| Rudy Gay (23)
| Marc Gasol (11)
| Mike Conley (9)
| Oracle Arena17,549
| 10–6
|- bgcolor=#ffcccc
| 17
| January 24
| @ Portland
| 
| O. J. Mayo (20)
| Marreese Speights (6)
| Mike Conley (7)
| Rose Garden20,602
| 10–7
|- bgcolor=#ffcccc
| 18
| January 26
| @ L.A. Clippers
| 
| Rudy Gay (24)
| Marc Gasol (11)
| Mike Conley (7)
| Staples Center19,275
| 10–8
|- bgcolor=#ffcccc
| 19
| January 28
| @ Phoenix
| 
| Rudy GayMarc Gasol (18)
| Marc Gasol (13)
| Mike Conley (10)
| US Airways Center14,903
| 10–9
|- bgcolor=#ffcccc
| 20
| January 30
| San Antonio
| 
| O. J. Mayo (17)
| Marc Gasol (12)
| Mike Conley (3)
| FedExForum15,118
| 10–10
|- bgcolor=#ccffcc
| 21
| January 31
| Denver
| 
| Rudy GayMarc Gasol (20)
| Rudy GayMarc Gasol (13)
| Mike Conley (6)
| FedExForum13,651
| 11–10

|- bgcolor=#ccffcc
| 22
| February 2
| @ Atlanta
| 
| Rudy Gay (21)
| Dante Cunningham (12)
| Mike Conley (6)
| Philips Arena14,211
| 12–10
|- bgcolor=#ffcccc
| 23
| February 3
| @ Oklahoma City
| 
| Marc Gasol (24)
| Marc GasolRudy Gay (8)
| Mike Conley (5)
| Chesapeake Energy Arena18,203
| 12–11
|- bgcolor=#ffcccc
| 24
| February 5
| @ Boston
| 
| Rudy Gay (21)
| Rudy Gay (7)
| Mike Conley (4)
| TD Garden(18,624)
| 12–12
|- bgcolor=#ffcccc
| 25
| February 6
| San Antonio
| 
| Marc Gasol (22)
| Marc Gasol (9)
| Mike Conley (8)
| FedExForum13,527
| 12–13
|- bgcolor=#ccffcc
| 26
| February 8
| Minnesota
| 
| Rudy Gay (19)
| Marreese Speights (15)
| Mike Conley (7)
| FedExForum13,287
| 13–13
|- bgcolor=#ccffcc
| 27
| February 10
| Indiana
| 
| Rudy Gay (21)
| Marreese Speights (9)
| Mike Conley (6)
| FedExForum16,281
| 14–13
|- bgcolor=#ffcccc
| 28
| February 12
| Utah
| 
| Rudy Gay (22)
| Marreese Speights (11)
| Mike Conley (6)
| FedExForum14,424
| 14–14
|- bgcolor=#ccffcc
| 29
| February 14
| Houston
| 
| Mike Conley (21)
| Rudy Gay (8)
| Mike Conley (4)
| FedExForum13,042
| 15–14
|- bgcolor=#ccffcc
| 30
| February 15
| @ New Jersey
| 
| Rudy Gay (25)
| Marreese Speights (18)
| Mike Conley (10)
| Prudential Center10,885
| 16–14
|- bgcolor=#ccffcc
| 31
| February 17
| Denver
| 
| Rudy Gay (20)
| Marc Gasol (14)
| Marc Gasol (8)
| FedExForum15,201
| 17–14
|- bgcolor=#ccffcc
| 32
| February 18
| Golden State
| 
| Rudy Gay (19)
| Marc Gasol (13)
| Mike Conley (6)
| FedExForum17,151
| 18–14
|- bgcolor=#ffcccc
| 33
| February 20
| @ Houston
| 
| Rudy Gay (23)
| Three players (7)
| Marc Gasol (5)
| Toyota Center12,525
| 18–15
|- bgcolor=#ccffcc
| 34
| February 21
| Philadelphia
| 
| Marc Gasol (15)
| Marc Gasol (14)
| Marc Gasol (7)
| FedExForum14,258
| 19–15
|- align="center"
|colspan="9" bgcolor="#bbcaff"|All-Star Break
|- bgcolor=#ccffcc
| 35
| February 29
| Dallas
| 
| Marc Gasol (22)
| Marc Gasol (11)
| Mike Conley (10)
| FedExForum17,023
| 20–15

|- bgcolor=#ccffcc
| 36
| March 2
| @ Toronto
| 
| Rudy Gay (23)
| Rudy Gay (12)
| Mike Conley (5)
| Air Canada Centre17,168
| 21–15
|- bgcolor=#ccffcc
| 37
| March 3
| Detroit
| 
| Marc GasolO. J. Mayo (17)
| Marc Gasol (9)
| Mike Conley (12)
| FedExForum17,569
| 22–15
|- bgcolor=#ccffcc
| 38
| March 7
| @ Golden State
| 
| Rudy Gay (26)
| Marc GasolRudy Gay (12)
| Mike Conley (12)
| Oracle Arena19,171
| 23–15
|- bgcolor=#ffcccc
| 39
| March 10
| @ Phoenix
| 
| Marc Gasol (21)
| Marc Gasol (8)
| Mike Conley (10)
| US Airways Center16,350
| 23–16
|- bgcolor=#ccffcc
| 40
| March 11
| @ Denver
| 
| O. J. Mayo (22)
| Marreese Speights (9)
| O. J. Mayo (8)
| Pepsi Center17,737
| 24–16
|- bgcolor=#ffcccc
| 41
| March 13
| L. A. Lakers
| 
| Marreese Speights (25)
| Marc Gasol (11)
| Mike Conley (11)
| FedExForum18,119
| 24–17
|- bgcolor=#ffcccc
| 42
| March 16
| Toronto
| 
| Marc Gasol (28)
| Rudy Gay (11)
| Mike Conley (10)
| FedExForum17,239
| 24–18
|- bgcolor=#ccffcc
| 43
| March 18
| Washington
| 
| Rudy Gay (27)
| Three players (9)
| Mike Conley (6)
| FedExForum15,412
| 25–18
|- bgcolor=#ffcccc
| 44
| March 20
| @ Sacramento
| 
| Rudy Gay (23)
| Marc Gasol (10)
| Mike Conley (9)
| Power Balance Pavilion11,105
| 25–19
|- bgcolor=#ffcccc
| 45
| March 22
| @ Portland
| 
| Marc Gasol (22)
| Marc Gasol (9)
| Tony Allen (6)
| Rose Garden20,636
| 25–20
|- bgcolor=#ffcccc
| 46
| March 24
| @ L. A. Clippers
| 
| Zach Randolph (14)
| Marc GasolZach Randolph (8)
| Mike Conley (9)
| Staples Center19,060
| 25–21
|- bgcolor=#ccffcc
| 47
| March 25
| @ L. A. Lakers
| 
| Rudy Gay (18)
| Zach Randolph (12)
| Mike Conley (8)
| Staples Center18,997
| 26–21
|- bgcolor=#ccffcc
| 48
| March 27
| Minnesota
| 
| Rudy Gay (21)
| Dante Cunningham (14)
| Mike Conley (8)
| FedExForum14,769
| 27–21
|- bgcolor=#ffcccc
| 49
| March 30
| @ Houston
| 
| Rudy Gay (20)
| Marc Gasol (9)
| O. J. Mayo (4)
| Toyota Center16,884
| 27–22
|- bgcolor=#ccffcc
| 50
| March 31
| @ Milwaukee
| 
| O. J. Mayo (24)
| Marc Gasol (15)
| O. J. Mayo (3)
| Bradley Center17,106
| 28–22

|- bgcolor=#ccffcc
| 51
| April 2
| @ Oklahoma City
| 
| O. J. Mayo (22)
| Marreese Speights (13)
| O. J. MayoZach Randolph (4)
| Chesapeake Energy Arena18,203
| 29–22
|- bgcolor=#ccffcc
| 52
| April 3
| Golden State
| 
| O. J. Mayo (19)
| Tony Allen (7)
| Marc Gasol (6)
| FedExForum14,310
| 30–22
|- bgcolor=#ffcccc
| 53
| April 4
| @ Dallas
| 
| O. J. Mayo (17)
| Marc Gasol (10)
| Marc Gasol (7)
| American Airlines Center20,233
| 30–23
|- bgcolor=#ccffcc
| 54
| April 6
| @ Miami
| 
| Rudy Gay (17)
| Zach Randolph (14)
| O. J. Mayo (6)
| American Airlines Arena20,008
| 31–23
|- bgcolor=#ccffcc
| 55
| April 7
| Dallas
| 
| Rudy Gay (25)
| Zach Randolph (11)
| Mike ConleyO. J. Mayo (5)
| FedExForum18,119
| 32–23
|- bgcolor=#ccffcc
| 56
| April 9
| L. A. Clippers
| 
| Marc Gasol (18)
| Zach Randolph (12)
| Marc Gasol (7)
| FedExForum17,219
| 33–23
|- bgcolor=#ccffcc
| 57
| April 11
| Phoenix
| 
| Rudy Gay (32)
| Zach Randolph (9)
| Mike Conley (7)
| FedExForum15,239
| 34–23
|- bgcolor=#ffcccc
| 58
| April 12
| @ San Antonio
| 
| Rudy Gay (19)
| Zach Randolph (11)
| Mike ConleyRudy Gay (4)
| AT&T Center18,581
| 34–24
|- bgcolor=#ccffcc
| 59
| April 14
| Utah
| 
| Rudy Gay (26)
| Rudy Gay (12)
| Mike Conley (6)
| FedExForum17,190
| 35–24
|- bgcolor=#ffcccc
| 60
| April 15
| @ New Orleans
| 
| Rudy Gay (24)
| Zach Randolph (13)
| Three players (3)
| New Orleans Arena15,570
| 35–25
|- bgcolor=#ccffcc
| 61
| April 17
| @ Minnesota
| 
| Rudy Gay (28)
| Zach Randolph (11)
| Mike Conley (8)
| Target Center16,709
| 36–25
|- bgcolor=#ccffcc
| 62
| April 18
| New Orleans
| 
| Rudy Gay (26)
| Zach Randolph (6)
| Mike Conley (5)
| FedExForum14,507
| 37–25
|- bgcolor=#ccffcc
| 63
| April 20
| @ Charlotte
| 
| Mike Conley (20)
| Rudy GayZach Randolph (6)
| Mike Conley (7)
| Time Warner Cable Arena13,428
| 38–25
|- bgcolor=#ccffcc
| 64
| April 21
| Portland
| 
| Rudy Gay (21)
| Marreese Speights (11)
| Marc Gasol (4)
| FedExForum17,904
| 39–25
|- bgcolor=#ccffcc
| 65
| April 23
| Cleveland
| 
| Marreese SpeightsMarc Gasol (17)
| Marreese Speights (10)
| O. J. Mayo (5)
| FedExForum15,504
| 40–25
|- bgcolor=#ccffcc
| 66
| April 26
| Orlando
| 
| Marc Gasol (22)
| Zach Randolph (12)
| O. J. Mayo (6)
| FedExForum17,215
| 41–25

Playoffs

Game log

|- bgcolor="ffcccc"
| 1
| April 29
| L. A. Clippers
| 
| Rudy Gay (19)
| Marreese Speights (9)
| Mike Conley (8)
| FedEx Forum18,119
| 0–1
|- bgcolor="ccffcc" 
| 2
| May 2
| L. A. Clippers
| 
| Rudy Gay (21)
| Zach Randolph (8)
| Mike Conley (6)
| FedEx Forum18,119
| 1–1
|- bgcolor="ffcccc"
| 3
| May 5
| @ L. A. Clippers
| 
| Rudy Gay (24)
| Marc Gasol (10)
| Mike Conley (8)
| Staples Center19,060
| 1–2
|- bgcolor="ffcccc"
| 4
| May 7
| @ L. A. Clippers
| 
| Mike Conley (25)
| Zach Randolph (9)
| Mike Conley (8)
| Staples Center 19,167
| 1–3
|- bgcolor="ccffcc"
| 5
| May 9
| L. A. Clippers
| 
| Marc Gasol (23)
| Zach Randolph (10)
| Mike Conley (6)
| FedEx Forum18,119
| 2–3
|- bgcolor="ccffcc"
| 6
| May 11
| @ L. A. Clippers
| 
| Marc Gasol (23)
| Zach Randolph (16)
| Mike Conley (9)
| Staples Center19,060
| 3–3
|- bgcolor="ffcccc"
| 7
| May 13
| L. A. Clippers
| 
| Rudy GayMarc Gasol (19)
| Zach Randolph (12)
| Mike Conley (5)
| FedEx Forum18,119
| 3–4

Milestones
April 26: Memphis set a franchise record for regular-season winning percentage (.621). The Grizzlies' previous best regular-season mark was .610, which they set during the 2003–04 season.

References

Memphis Grizzlies seasons
Memphis Grizzlies
Memphis Grizzlies
Memphis Grizzlies
Events in Memphis, Tennessee